Los Restos Indígenas de Pichilemu (The Indigenous Remains of Pichilemu) was a 1908 book published by Chilean historian José Toribio Medina.

Medina presents a report of his examination to indigenous rests found in a Pichilemu grotto (currently named Virgin's Grotto—) by Agustín Ross and Evaristo Merino in 1908. The book contains two sheets, that show some tools that Promoucaes indigenous used.

References

External links 
 Spanish Wikisource has original text related to this article: Los Restos Indígenas de Pichilemu.

External links 

1908 non-fiction books
20th-century history books
Books about Pichilemu
History books about Chile
History of Pichilemu
Public domain books